Scopula asiatica is a moth of the family Geometridae. It is found in Iran.

References

Moths described in 1938
asiatica
Endemic fauna of Iran
Moths of Asia